‘Alā’ al-Dīn Abu al-Ḥasan ‘Alī ibn ‘Inān ibn Mughāmis ibn Rumaythah ibn Abī Numayy al-Ḥasanī was Emir of Mecca from 1423 to 1425.

Notes

References

People from Mecca